Naipur is a small village in Mansurchak Block in Begusarai District of Bihar State, India. It is located 35 km towards North from District headquarters Begusarai. 1 km from Mansurchak.

Demographics

Transport

Roadways
Dalsinghsarai are the nearby by towns to Naipur having road connectivity to Naipur

Railways
Bachhwara Junction Rail Way Station, Fateha Rail Way Station are the very nearby railway stations to Naipur. Dalsingh Sarai Rail Way Station (near to Dalsinghsarai), Sathajagat Rail Way Station (near to Dalsinghsarai) are the Rail way stations reachable from near by towns.

Climate

Education
Middle school naipur

References

Villages in Begusarai district